Pam Stewart is a former Florida Education Commissioner. She served from 2013 until 2018. Earlier in her career she was a teacher, principal, and administrator. She was succeeded by Richard Corcoran. She was appointed by Rick Scott and succeeded Tony Bennett.

References

Florida Commissioners of Education
Year of birth missing (living people)
Living people